Naan is a 2012 Indian Tamil-language crime thriller film written and directed by Jeeva Shankar in his directorial debut. Composer Vijay Antony plays the lead role of a psychopathic killer; he also produced the film and worked as the music director. Siddharth Venugopal and Rupa Manjari appeared in supporting roles. The filming of Naan began in October 2011, and the film was released on 15 August 2012. The movie was remade in Bengali in 2015 as Amanush 2 and in Kannada in 2016 as Asthitva. The film was followed by a sequel titled Salim, an action thriller that released in 2014. The plot of the film is loosely based on 1999 American film The Talented Mr. Ripley.

Plot
Karthik (Vijay Antony) is a brilliant student but already shows signs of criminal behavior at childhood itself, like forging his friend's parent's signature on a mark sheet. Sent home from school early for this misdeed, Karthik is shocked to discover his mother (Charmila) in bed with his uncle. His mother begs him not to tell his father, but he does so, and his father commits suicide and dies. Karthik's mother and his uncle continue their relationship; Karthik then kills his mother and his uncle by setting the house on fire. He is sent to a juvenile home where he grows up. On his release, the warden gives him the address of another of his uncles and asks him to concentrate on his studies.

Karthik's aunt is not interested in taking him in, so he goes to Chennai to start a new life. As fate would have it, the bus meets with an accident, and his co-passenger, Mohammed Salim (Ratchasan Saravanan) eventually dies. Karthik steals Salim's documents, adopts his identity, and due to his high marks of Salim, enrolls in a Government medical college in MBBS. He develops friendships with a rich class mate named Ashok (Siddharth Venugopal), his girlfriend Rupa (Rupa Manjari), and their friend Suresh (Vijay Victor). Ashok allows Salim to stay in his house rent-free, seeing his innocent and good nature. Later, Salim and Ashok encounter the same warden from the former's juvenile home, who seems to recognize Karthik. However, since Karthik is now impersonating Salim, he picks an argument with the warden and swears that he is not the person he thinks. This incident causes Ashok to develop a dilemma towards Salim's identity.

One day, Ashok and Suresh plan to go to a farmhouse without Rupa. Suresh suggests that they take some other girls along. Salim lets Rupa know of this plan due to her sincere and true love for Ashok. Rupa starts to suspect Ashok's fidelity, and Ashok worries that Salim betrayed him by complaining about him to Rupa. Ashok slaps Salim angrily and asks him to get out of his place. Salim, seeing no other way, apologizes to him and looks for another lodging.

Ashok is still full of suspicion. While Salim takes bath, Ashok opens his briefcase. He finds a photo of Karthik's biological father and realizes that it was a different man who Karthik had introduced as his actual father earlier. Suddenly, Salim enters the room and asks Ashok to give back the photo. Ashok refuses, removes Salim's towel, and confirms that he is not a Muslim, as he was not circumcised. Salim gets angry and pushes Ashok; Ashok hits his head on a table and dies. At first, Salim is shocked and depressed by this unexpected accident, but he then covers up the murder by burying Ashok's body in a graveyard at the outskirts, so intelligently that no one ever finds out that Ashok is dead. When a family friend of Ashok's, who has seen Ashok only in his childhood, plans to meet him, Salim successfully impersonates Ashok in front of Ashok's own parents and Rupa.

Suresh, however, discovers Salim's deception. Salim then kills Suresh and buries him at the same graveyard. The following day, the police come to Ashok's house and reveal that they have found Suresh's corpse. They interrogate several people in the city including Salim, but they cannot find the truth. They conclude that Ashok killed Suresh due to an old personal vengeance and then absconded; meanwhile, they consider Karthik (now back to impersonating Salim) as an innocent and a hard-working student. Karthik continues to live as Salim, after seeking permission from Salim's father and promises to take care of him forever. The film ends with the tagline "To Be Continued", and the story of Salim becoming a successful doctor is shown in its sequel movie, Salim which was released in the year 2014.

Cast
 Vijay Antony as Karthik, later Mohammed Salim
 Siddharth Venugopal as Ashok Ravindran
 Rupa Manjari as Roopa.
 Anuya Bhagvath as Priya
 Vijay Victor as Suresh
 Vibha Natarajan as Uma
 Charmila as Karthik's mother
 Ratchasan Saravanan as the original Mohammed Salim
 Pramod as Inspector Duraipandiyan
 Krishnamoorthy
 Shyam as Ashok's enemy

Production
The film was initially launched in 2008, with Siddharth Venugopal and Rukmini Vijayakumar playing the lead roles, however, due to the failure of his previous film Ananda Thandavam, the producer Oscar Ravichandran called off the project. The film restarted with Vijay Antony's intervention in October 2011 who also took the lead role from Siddharth.

Soundtrack

The soundtrack has six tracks, composed by Vijay Antony himself. Following Yuvan Shankar Raja, who created single tracks in Vaanam and Mankatha, Vijay Antony too released a single track "Makkayala Makkayala" in June 2012. All the songs in the album are composed by Vijay Antony.

Release

Critical reception
Malathi Rangarajan of The Hindu praised as "Well done!" and said: "A plethora of pluses make Naan watch-worthy. Vijay Antony’s acumen comes to the fore in his choice of a subject that’s strong and a character that’s stronger". N. Venkateswaran of The Times of India gave Naan 3.5 out of 5 stars, writing that "but for some minor blips, the writing (and therefore the movie too) is pretty gripping throughout, and keeps the audience on the edge of the seats", calling it "[T]he perfect thriller to spice up the weekend". IBNLive wrotet that "'Naan' is racy and appealing"  and also adding that "it is a racy crime thriller that is quite an appealing effort from Jeeva Shankar and Vijay Antony." The Behindwoods Review Board gave the film 2.5 out of 5, calling it a "suspense thriller that works for most parts." Deccan Chronicle stated that "Vijay Antony changes beat". Sify rated it average, calling it a "decent psychological thriller."

Upon release, it was noted that the film had been inspired by The Talented Mr. Ripley.

Other languages
It was remade in Bengali as Amanush 2 which released in April 2015. Kannada Remake released in 2016 as Asthitva.

Awards

Legacy
A sequel to the movie was released in August 2014 by the name Salim. In March 2014, it was reported that the film would be remade in Hindi with Prashanth in the lead role. Despite a production delay, Thiagarajan confirmed during an interview that the film would be made in February 2017.

References

External links
 Official website
 

2012 films
2010s Tamil-language films
2012 crime drama films
2012 crime thriller films
2012 psychological thriller films
Indian crime drama films
Indian crime thriller films
Indian psychological drama films
Tamil-language psychological thriller films
Films about identity theft
Films about murderers
Films based on American novels
Films based on crime novels
Films scored by Vijay Antony
Tamil films remade in other languages
2012 directorial debut films
Films based on works by Patricia Highsmith